Trataka (Sanskrit n. त्राटक Trāṭak: "look, gaze") is a yogic purification (a shatkarma) and a tantric method of meditation that involves staring at a single point such as a small object, black dot or candle flame.

Description
The practitioner may fix attention on a symbol or yantra, such as the Om symbol, a black dot, the image of some deity or guru, a flame, a mirror or any point, and stare at it. A candle should be three to four feet (1 metre plus) away, the flame level with the eyes. The practitioner relaxes but keeps the spine erect and remains wakeful and vigilant.

Notes

External links

Trataka Meditation
Trataka - Technique of Opening The Third Eye
Trataka - Light in the Pineal Eye

Further reading
 The Bihar School of Yoga, in India has published several books on meditation that give detailed instructions for practising trataka. Dharana Darshan by Swami Niranjanananda Saraswati has an entire chapter devoted to the practice.
 A clinical study to evaluate the efficacy of Trataka Yoga Kriya and eye exercises (non-pharmacological methods) in the management of Timira (Ammetropia and Presbyopia)

Buddhist meditation
Kriyas
Shatkarmas